Glastonbury is a rural town and locality in the Gympie Region, Queensland, Australia.

Geography
Greendale is a neighbourhood in the north of the locality.

History 
Glastonbury Provisional School opened on 16 August 1879. On 1 January 1909, it became Glastonbury State School. It closed on 6 June 1960. It was also known as Glastonbury Creek State School.

Greendale Provisional School opened on 21 October 1930 and closed in 1941. It reopened in 1947 and in 1948 became Greendale State School. It closed on 5 June 1960.

Heritage listings 
Glastonbury has the following heritage sites:

 1329 Glastonbury Road: Glastonbury Hall

References

External links 
 

Towns in Queensland
Gympie Region
Localities in Queensland